Farnley is a village and civil parish in the Harrogate district of North Yorkshire, England, near Otley, West Yorkshire. The name "Farnley" indicates that the village was first established in an area heavy with ferns. It is mentioned in the 1086 Domesday Book as Fernelai and Fernelie.

To the south of the village lies Farnley Hall, a stately home built by John Carr. The house has a rich history, being associated with names such as Fairfax, Cromwell, and Turner. A selection of Turner's works from the Farnley Hall collection were sold in 1890 for £25,000.

The primary school in Farnley is occasionally used as a location for filming the soap opera Emmerdale.

When found as a surname the most popular is Fearnley; other surnames related to the area are Farnely, Farnley and Fernleigh.

References

External links

Villages in North Yorkshire
Civil parishes in North Yorkshire
Borough of Harrogate